The 1934 Spring Hill Badgers football team was an American football team that represented Spring Hill College as a member of the Dixie Conference during the 1934 college football season. In Mike Donahue's first and only season as head coach, the team compiled a record of 4–5 overall with a mark of 0–4 in conference play, placing last out of nine teams in the Dixie Conference.

Schedule

References

Spring Hill
Spring Hill Badgers football seasons
Spring Hill Badgers football